Facing the Wall (in Hebrew: עם הפנים לקיר) is a 2016 Israeli short film, written and directed by Aalam-Warqe Davidian. The film won the best picture award at the International Student Film Festival and the Van Lir best short film award at the 2016 Jerusalem Film Festival.

Plot summary 
The film follows Surni, a 14 year old Ethiopian girl who is newly arrived in Israel. Surni wakes up to her first day in an immigrant absorption center, without the boy she loves. She shuts herself in her room, refusing to open her eyes or get out of bed. Her mother, who is also missing home, tries to help her find a way for the both of them to say goodbye to the world they left behind.

Cast of characters

Awards and festivals 

 2016 - Ophir awards - best short film (nominated)
 2016 - International Student Film Festival,  best independent short film
 2016 - Jerusalem Film Festival, Van Lir award, best short film
 2017 - Festival de Cine Africano, best short film award
 2017 - Toronto International Film Festival 
 2017 - Toronto Jewish Film Festival
 2017 - Festival Olhares do Mediterrâneo
 2017 - Rhode Island Flickers International Film Festival
 2018 - Hearland Festival
 2018 - San Diego Jewish Film Festival

References

External links 
 

Israeli independent films
Israeli short films
Student films
2016 films